SIOX may refer to:

 Serial Input/Output eXchange an asynchronous datacommunications bus.
 Simple Interactive Object Extraction an algorithm for extracting foreground objects from color photographs.
 Silicon oxide (SiOx)
 Sistema de Ingresos de Oaxaca